The following units and commanders fought in the Battle of Trevilian Station of the American Civil War on the Union side. The Confederate order of battle is shown separately. Order of battle compiled from the corps organization during the battle and from the casualty returns.

Abbreviations used

Military rank
 MG = Major General
 BG = Brigadier General
 Col = Colonel
 Ltc = Lieutenant Colonel
 Maj = Major
 Cpt = Captain
 Lt = Lieutenant

Other
 w = wounded
 mw = mortally wounded
 c = captured

Army of the Potomac

Cavalry Corps

MG Philip H. Sheridan

Escort:
 6th United States: Cpt Ira W. Claflin

Notes

References
 Wittenberg, Eric J. Glory Enough For All: Sheridan's Second Raid and the Battle of Trevilian Station. Washington, DC: Brassey's, Inc., 2001. .

American Civil War orders of battle